The Skoda–El Mir theorem is a theorem of complex geometry, 
stated as follows:

Theorem (Skoda, El Mir, Sibony).  Let X be a complex manifold, and 
E a closed complete pluripolar set in X. Consider a closed positive current  on 

Notes

References
J.-P. Demailly, L² vanishing theorems for positive line bundles and adjunction theory, Lecture Notes of a CIME course on "Transcendental Methods of Algebraic Geometry" (Cetraro, Italy, July 1994)

Complex manifolds
Several complex variables
Theorems in geometry